Loud Like Love is the seventh studio album by British alternative rock band Placebo, recorded between 2012 and 2013 and released on 16 September 2013.

The album reached number 13 in the UK Albums Chart, and received a mixed response from critics. Three singles were released from the album: "Too Many Friends", "Loud Like Love" and "A Million Little Pieces". It is the band's final album to featured the drummer Steve Forrest.

Background

During the Battle for the Sun tour, band members Brian Molko and Stefan Olsdal both stated on various occasions that they were working on material for the next studio album. In November 2011, the band announced via their Facebook page and official website that they will be returning to the studio in 2012 to record their seventh studio album.

Recording
Molko was originally working on material for a possible solo release, and he wrote various songs for it that would later appear on Loud Like Love. The band went in the recording studio to record some singles, but then they began to record more and more material.

The album was recorded in London's RAK Studios, where Placebo had also recorded their fifth studio album, Meds. Production duties, as well as mixing, were handled by Adam Noble.

Composition
The album revolves around the theme of love, in all different forms: romance, happiness and also heartbreak. "Too Many Friends" deals with people spending time on the internet and end up being far more close to the hundreds of friends on the internet than off the computer. "Rob the Bank" is about somebody loving you unconditionally, even if you, in this case, rob a bank.

Release
The album was announced on 21 May 2013 through the band's official website. Loud Like Love's track listing and its first single, "Too Many Friends", were officially announced on 17 June 2013.

The album's lead single, "Too Many Friends", was released on 8 July 2013. The music video, written and directed by Saman Kesh, was filmed in Los Angeles, and features the first collaboration between Placebo and American novelist Bret Easton Ellis. Another song premiered from the album is the track "Loud Like Love", which was released as a digital download on 6 August 2013 and as a single on 18 March 2014.

The album was released worldwide on 16 September 2013. The release formats include a box set, a deluxe CD digipack with the DVD "Live at RAK Studios", a CD and a 12" vinyl. On the day of Loud Like Love'''s release, an internet show titled "LLLTV" was streamed live from YouTube Studios in London. It was the first YouTube live stream of its kind. The show featured, among other things, Placebo performing songs from the album and older songs (chosen in part by the audience through an online poll), band interviews and guest appearances by people who collaborated with Placebo on the making of the album.

The album entered the UK Albums Chart at number 13, the first time Placebo have missed the UK Top Ten in ten years (since Sleeping With Ghosts) and their lowest UK album position ever. The album also entered the French Albums Chart at number 3, the first time they missed the French number one spot since Without You I'm Nothing fifteen years earlier. The album charted in the Australian Albums Chart at number 9 and at number 18 in the Irish Albums Chart. Loud Like Love is also the first Placebo album to miss the Portuguese Top Five, peaking at number 15. The album entered the US Billboard chart at number 98, where the previous one, Battle For The Sun, reached number 51. The album did peak at number 1 in Switzerland, Placebo's third album in a row to do so. This currently is the album's only number 1 peak.

Reception

"Loud Like Love" was met with generally mixed reviews from music critics. The album holds an approval rating of 55/100 at Metacritic, which indicates a mixed or average reception.Alternative Press' Mischa Pearlman wrote that "too much of this album comes off like self-parody, meaning it's a far cry from the pulverizing power of their best work". AllMusic wrote that "many of these songs play like less-alienated, if no less paranoid, OK Computer-era Radiohead cuts", adding that "however, the songs here are still laden with Molko's high-pitched vocals, which he characteristically uses to play the eternally angst-ridden and alienated teenager -- something the band's fans will surely appreciate", giving the album 3.5 stars out of 5. Amanda Arber of Clash said that Loud Like Love is "easy to absorb musically and easy to ignore lyrically" and "50 minutes of simply okay alt-rock." The Guardian gave the album two stars out of five, saying "the veteran band sticks to what it knows for Loud Like Love''."

Track listing

Charts

Weekly charts

Year-end charts

Certifications and sales

Release history

Personnel
Placebo
Brian Molko – vocals, guitar, keyboards
Stefan Olsdal – bass guitar, guitar, piano, keyboards, cimbalom, backing vocals
Steve Forrest – drums, percussion
with:
Bill Lloyd – keyboards, bass guitar
Fiona Brice – string arrangements, backing vocals
Fabian Waltmann – additional programming
Technical
Adam Noble – production, mixing, programming
Mike Horner – assistant engineer (RAK Studios, London)
John Prestage – assistant engineer (Strongroom Studios, London)
Tom Bailey – assistant engineer (Air Studios, London)
Dick Beetham – mastering
Joseph Llanes – photography

References

2013 albums
Placebo (band) albums
Universal Records albums
Albums recorded at RAK Studios